Gaslight Music Hall is an Australian television series which aired from 1959 to 1960. Originally aired on ABC, it later moved to TCN-9. Produced in Sydney, it was a live variety show spoofing Victorian music hall. Cast included Henry Gilbert, John Bluthal, June Salter, and Michael Cole. According to a section of TV Merry-Go-Round in the 27 September 1959 edition of Sydney Morning Herald, the first episode included a comedy sketch spoofing melodrama.

References

External links
Gaslight Music Hall on IMDb

1959 Australian television series debuts
1960 Australian television series endings
Australian variety television shows
Australian Broadcasting Corporation original programming
Black-and-white Australian television shows
Australian live television series